Liberal Democrats may refer to:

 supporters of liberal democracy
 Liberal Democrats (UK), a political party in the United Kingdom
 Liberal Democratic Party (Australia), a political party in Australia, also known as Liberal Democrats
 left-liberals or social liberals in the Democratic Party (United States)
 Liberal Democrats (Italy), a political party in Italy
 Liberal Democratic Party (France), a political party in France
 Liberal Democrats (Germany), a political party in Germany
 Liberal Democrats (Sudan), a political party in Sudan
 Liberal Democratic Party (Belarus), a political party in Belarus, also known as Liberal Democrats
 Liberal Democrats (Belgium), a political party in Belgium
 Liberal Democratic Party (Japan), a political party in Japan, also known as Liberal Democrats
 Liberal Democratic Party (Netherlands), a political party in the Netherlands
 Liberal Democrats (Slovenia), a political party in Slovenia 
 Liberal Democratic Party of Russia, a political party in Russia, also known as Liberal Democrats
 Liberal Democratic Party of Ukraine, a political party in Ukraine, also known as Liberal Democrats
 Croatian People's Party – Liberal Democrats, a political party in Croatia, sometimes shortened as Liberal Democrats
 Order of the Nation (political party), a political party in the Czech Republic formerly known as LiDem – Liberal Democrats

See also
 List of Liberal Democratic parties

Political party disambiguation pages